The EF86 is a high transconductance sharp cutoff pentode vacuum tube with Noval (B9A) base for audio-frequency applications.

It was introduced by the Mullard company in 1953  and was produced by Philips, Mullard, Telefunken, Valvo, and GEC among others. It is very similar electrically to the octal base EF37A and the Rimlock base EF40. Unlike many pentodes, it was designed specifically for audio applications, with low noise and low microphony] claimed advantages, although a rubber-mounted vibration-resistant base was still recommended. It has a much higher stage gain than any triode, which makes it susceptible to microphony. The EF86 was used in many preamplifier designs during the last decades of vacuum tube hi-fi development. An industrial tube variant is known as 6267. In the former Soviet Union a variant was also produced as type 6Zh32P (Russian: 6Ж32П.)   EF86s were being produced in Russia in two versions under the Electro-Harmonix brand and in the Slovak Republic as JJ Electronic (formerly Tesla).

Characteristics 
6.3 Volt, 200 mA indirectly-heated A.F. miniature pentode with Noval (B9A) base with an EIA 9CQ (or 9BJ) basing diagram.
 Transconductance: 2.2 mA/V at Ia=3.0 mA, Ig2=0.6 mA, Va=250 V, Vg1=-2.2 V, Vg2=140 V, Vg3=0 V
 Voltage gain: 185 (45dB) at Vsupply=250 V, Ik=0.9 mA, Rk=2.2 kilohm, Ra=220 kilohm, Rg1=1 megohm, Vout<44 VRMS

Special precautions have been taken in the design to reduce the:
 Hum (through a bifilar-wound twisted pair of heater wires),
 noise, and
 microphony (through a rigid internal structure to reduce resonances).

The EF86 is much less noisy than other pentodes, but slightly noisier than some triodes at about 2 µV equivalent input noise to 10 kHz. Although used in circuits such as tape recorder input stages and instrument amplifiers, microphony can be a problem, even when mounted in a vibration-reducing valve holder.

Equivalent and similar devices 
 6267 * Z729 * CV2901 * 6BK8 * 6CF8 * 6F22 * CV8068 * CV10098

Special quality:
 EF86SQ * M8195 * CV4085 * EF806S

Different heater requirements:
 PF86, 300 mA (4.5 V)
 UF86, 100 mA (12.6 V)

The rarely used EF83 is a remote-cutoff pentode otherwise similar to the EF86; the remote cutoff (variable mu) makes it suitable for applications such as automatic gain control (AGC) in tape recorders.

References

External links 
 Tubeworld.com's EF86 page
 Mullard's EF86 at the National Valve Museum
 The Mullard EF36, EF37 and EF37A at the National Valve Museum
 TDSL Tube data: EF86
 Datasheet for Thorn/Mazda 6F22/EF86 (pdf)

Vacuum tubes
Guitar amplification tubes